Orlando Radhames Antigua Fernández (born February 20, 1973), nicknamed "Hurricane", is a former Dominican-American basketball player and is currently an assistant coach at the University of Kentucky under John Calipari. He is widely known as becoming the first Hispanic and the first non-black player for the Harlem Globetrotters in 52 years when he signed in 1995. After his retirement from playing professional basketball he was named an assistant coach for the Pittsburgh Panthers, the Memphis Tigers, the Illinois Fighting Illini and the Kentucky Wildcats. In 2014, he was named the head coach of South Florida, which he held until 2017. He is also the head coach of the Dominican Republic national basketball team.

Early years
Antigua was born in the Dominican Republic to a Dominican father and Puerto Rican mother. The family moved to New York City and lived in the Bronx where he was raised. There Antigua and his two siblings received their primary and secondary education. He attended St. Raymond's High School, where he played basketball.

On Halloween night in 1988, Antigua became the victim of a drive-by shooting and was shot in the head near his left eye. He recovered from the shooting, however the doctors were unable to retrieve the bullet until a later time. He was back playing basketball just two months after the incident and gained media attention as the kid who'd taken a bullet to the head in a drive-by in his rough Bronx neighborhood. During this period of his life Antigua's family also went through a period of homelessness. He kept the family together while housing was secured.

He overcame these difficulties and went on to serve as student council president at his high school and played a major role in the program's New York Catholic League Championship run under head coach Gary DeCesare. As a senior, he earned All-New York City and Parade All America Second Team honors. Antigua also played on the Gauchos youth basketball team. He caught the attention of various scouts during his high school playing days and was signed with the University of Pittsburgh.

Pittsburgh Panthers
From 1991 to 1995 Antigua played basketball for the University of Pittsburgh Panthers basketball team. Antigua's performance during his freshman (Big East All-Rookie Team) and sophomore years under coach Paul Evans contributed to an appearance in the NIT (National Invitation Tournament) second round, and an NCAA tournament berth the season after. Antigua was named the recipient of the United States Basketball Writers' Association (USBWA) Most Courageous Award in 1994, an honor presented annually to an individual associated with college basketball who displays exceptional courage both on and off the floor. As a member of the Panthers, Antigua ranks 11th all-time in career 3-pointers made (117) and sixth in career 3-point field goal percentage (.386). He also ranks among the school's career leaders in blocked shots with 78, the 12th best total in Panthers history.

Basketball in Puerto Rico and the Dominican Republic
Antigua was able to play basketball in the Puerto Rican and Dominican basketball leagues because of his parents' Puerto Rican and Dominican roots. During his college years he would spend summers from 1991 to 1993 playing for the Gigantes de Carolina (Carolina Giants), a team in the Baloncesto Superior Nacional (BSN). Antigua averaged 7.5 points and 4.5 rebounds in 1991, 10.4 points and 3.7 rebounds in 1992, and 8.7 points and 4.4 rebounds in 1993.

Antigua continued to play for Carolina in 1996 and 1997 and averaged a career-high 16.8 points in 1997. He ended his professional playing career in 2002 with Mets de Guaynabo.

In 1998, Antigua played for the Dominican Republic national team, which came close to representing the country in the Olympics and World championships for the first time in the history of its program. The team, however fell short in the qualifications. Among his teammates were fellow BSN player Franklyn Western, of the Vaqueros de Bayamón (Bayamon Cowboys) and NBA player Felipe López.

Harlem Globetrotters
In December 1995, Antigua graduated from the University of Pittsburgh with a degree in social sciences. He  received offers from various NBA teams to attend their camps and also received offers from European scouts, but instead he decided to sign a deal to play for the world-renowned Harlem Globetrotters. Antigua, thus became the first Hispanic and the first non-black player on the Globetrotters' roster since Bob Karstens played with the squad in 1942–43. He made his debut as a Globetrotter in Pittsburgh and was nicknamed "Hurricane" because of his dazzling moves and quickness.

During the seven years in which he played with the Globetrotters, he represented the squad in 49 different countries and on tours to South America, South Africa and on the acclaimed "Youth in Our Lives Tour." Antigua met many people such as Muhammad Ali, Michael Jordan and Magic Johnson. He did commercials and showed his skills on the Late Show with David Letterman and in Regis and Kathy Lee. According to Antigua, he rates meeting Nelson Mandela in South Africa as his favorite moment. He retired from the Globetrotters in February 2002.

Coaching career
From 2002–03, Antigua served as an assistant basketball coach at Mt. Lebanon High School under Joey David and worked as a sales representative for Cavanaugh Promotions in the North Hills. In 2003, Antigua returned to University of Pittsburgh men's basketball as the director of  operations under head coach Jamie Dixon, and on June 7, 2006, was named an assistant coach.

In 2008, Antigua was hired as an assistant coach for the University of Memphis men's basketball program where he joined head coach John Calipari's staff. He then followed Calipari to the University of Kentucky to take an assistant job there.

On March 31, 2014, Antigua was named the new head coach of the South Florida Bulls. He left Kentucky's staff at the conclusion of the 2014 NCAA Tournament. He was also the head coach of the Dominican Republic national basketball team from 2013 to 2015. On January 3, 2017, USF dismissed Antigua as their head coach.

On April 5, 2017, Antigua was added to Brad Underwood's staff at Illinois.

In April 2021, it was rumored that Orlando Antigua may return to the University of Kentucky as an Assistant Coach under John Calipari.

This was made official on May 6, 2021, when Kentucky announced that Antigua and Illinois assistant coach Ronald “Chin” Coleman had been added to their staff.

Awards and recognitions
Among the many awards and recognitions which Antigua has received are the following:

1991–95 Named the United States Basketball Writers' Association Most Courageous Athlete award recipient
Named to Big East All-Rookie Team after the 1991–92 season; started in 78 games, averaged 8.0 points and 3.5 rebounds in 116 career games from 1991–95; concluded career as one of Pittsburgh's best all-time three-point shooters (.386- 117–303).
Named one of the nation's top-100 most influential Hispanic Americans by Hispanic Business magazine.

Head coaching record

See also

 List of Puerto Ricans
 List of people from the Dominican Republic

References

1973 births
Living people
Basketball coaches from New York (state)
Basketball players from New York City
Baloncesto Superior Nacional players
Dominican Republic people of Puerto Rican descent
Harlem Globetrotters players
High school basketball coaches in Pennsylvania
Illinois Fighting Illini men's basketball coaches
Kentucky Wildcats men's basketball coaches
Memphis Tigers men's basketball coaches
Parade High School All-Americans (boys' basketball)
Pittsburgh Panthers men's basketball coaches
Pittsburgh Panthers men's basketball players
Puerto Rican men's basketball players
South Florida Bulls men's basketball coaches
Dominican Republic emigrants to the United States
Forwards (basketball)